Werner Enterprises, Inc. is an American transportation and logistics company, serving the United States, Mexico and Canada. Werner Enterprises stated that it had 2021 revenues of $2.7 billion and over 13,500 employees and contractors.

History 
In 1956, Clarence "CL" Werner sold his family vehicle for a Ford Motor Company gasoline-powered truck, and began hauling cargo for other companies. In 1964, CL moved his company out of his home and into a shop in Council Bluffs, Iowa. In 1977, Werner Enterprises moved its corporate headquarters to its current location in Omaha, Nebraska. By 1999, Werner had expanded its operations into Mexico, reaching one billion dollars in revenue. Werner was among the five largest truckload carriers in the United States in 2020.

Operations 
Werner's fleet consists of approximately 10,000 tractors, 26,000 trailers and employs 13,500 employees and independent contractors.

Werner's common stock trades on the NASDAQ Global Select Market under the symbol .

References

External links 
Official website

Companies listed on the Nasdaq
Companies based in Omaha, Nebraska
Trucking companies of the United States
Transport companies established in 1956
1956 establishments in Nebraska
Transportation companies based in Nebraska